Ramonet may refer to:

People with the surname
Édouard Ramonet (1909-1980), French politician.
Ignacio Ramonet (born 1943), Spanish journalist and writer.

Other
Domaine Ramonet-Prudhon, French wine producer.